Eventyr is an album by Norwegian jazz composer and saxophonist Jan Garbarek, guitarist John Abercrombie and percussionist Naná Vasconcelos recorded in 1980 and released on the ECM label in 1981.

Reception
The Allmusic review awarded the album 2½ stars.

Track listing
All compositions by Jan Garbarek, John Abercrombie and Naná Vasconcelos except as indicated

 "Soria Maria" - 11:39
 "Lillekort" - 5:02
 "Eventyr" - 9:19
 "Weaving a Garland" (Traditional) - 2:20
 "Once Upon a Time" - 9:02
 "The Companion" (Garbarek, Vasconcelos) - 5:49
 "Snipp, Snapp, Snute" (Garbarek, Vasconcelos) - 4:30
 "East of the Sun and West of the Moon" - 8:27

Personnel
Jan Garbarek - soprano saxophone, tenor saxophone, flutes
John Abercrombie - guitars
Naná Vasconcelos - berimbau, talking drum, percussion, voice

References

ECM Records albums
Jan Garbarek albums
1981 albums
Albums produced by Manfred Eicher